Amatopo or Amotopo is a Tiriyó village on the Courentyne River in the Sipaliwini District of Suriname. The Frederik Willem IV Falls and Arapahu Island are located near the village.

Overview
The residents of the village consider themselves Okomoyana, which means "wasp people". The Okomoyana category can be seen as a subdivision of the Tiriyó people, and the Okomoyana indeed speak the Tiriyó language. The villagers who settled in the village came from Kwamalasamutu.

The airstrip was constructed during Operation Grasshopper. In the West Suriname Plan, Amatopo was to play an important role in the mining of bauxite in the area. Even a road was constructed from Amatopo to Paramaribo, but this road was deserted after the Surinamese Interior War. The first two settlers moved into the unused buildings near the airstrip. Later a pilot chased them away. Asongo Alalaparu, the granman (paramount chief) told them to return, and built their houses next to the facilities which were already present. The settlement started in 2001.

Frederik Willem IV Falls 

The Frederik Willem IV Falls also Anora Falls are located in the Courentyne River near Amatopo. In 1871, Charles Barrington Brown discovered that the river above the waterfalls splits into two rivers giving rise to the Tigri Area dispute between Suriname and Guyana. Arapahu Island is a river island located below the waterfalls.

Tourism 
An eco-lodge at Arapahu Island is situated half an hour upstream from Amatopo. The visitors of the eco-lodge make use of Amatopo Airstrip to reach their destination.

Notes

References 

Indigenous villages in Suriname
Populated places in Sipaliwini District
Squatting in Suriname